Oscar Gustavo Leal is a retired Argentinian association football forward who played professionally in the USL A-League.

In 1997, Leal signed with the expansion Orange County Zodiac of the USISL A-League.  He played for Orange County through the 2000 season when the team was known as the Waves.  In 2001, he moved to the El Paso Patriots for one season.

References
LA Galaxy 2000

Living people
1972 births
Argentine footballers
Argentine expatriate footballers
El Paso Patriots players
Orange County Blue Star players
A-League (1995–2004) players
Association football forwards